Barrett–Chumney House is a historic plantation house near Amelia Court House, Amelia County, in the U.S. state of Virginia. The house was largely built about 1823, and is a two-story, five-bay frame central-hall building with weatherboarded exterior and hipped standing-seam metal roof. It is a Federal-style I-house with a notable Federal-style door surround. The house was remodeled in about 1859, with the addition of Greek Revival elements.  Also on the property are a contributing tobacco barn, two sheds, and a carriage house/garage.

It was added to the National Register of Historic Places in 2011. It is also on the Virginia Department of Historic Resources list of historic African American sites in Virginia.

References

Plantation houses in Virginia
Houses on the National Register of Historic Places in Virginia
Federal architecture in Virginia
Greek Revival houses in Virginia
Houses completed in 1823
Houses in Amelia County, Virginia
National Register of Historic Places in Amelia County, Virginia